Sultanabad may refer to:

Armenia
Paghakn, Armenia, formerly called Sultanabad

India
Sultanabad, Peddapalli district, Telangana, India

Iran
Arak, Iran, formerly called Soltan-Abad
Eqbaliyeh, Iran, formerly Sultanabad
Kashmar, Iran, formerly Soultanabad
Soltanabad, Alborz, also called Sultanabad
Soltanabad-e Aran, also called Sultanabad
Soltanabad, Arzuiyeh, also called Sultanabad
Soltanabad, Kharameh, also called Sultanabad
Soltanabad, Markazi, also called Sultanabad
Soltanabad, Hamadan, also called Sultanabad
Soltanabad, Kangavar, also called Sultanabad
Soltanabad, Malayer, also called Sultanabad
Soltanabad, Qazvin, also called Sultanabad
Soltanabad, Razavi Khorasan, also called Sultanabad
Soltanabad, Khvaf, also called Sultanabad
Soltanabad, Mahvelat, also called Sultanabad
Soltanabad-e Namak, also called Sultanabad
Soltaneb, also called Sultanabad

Pakistan
Sultanabad Colony, Ismaili Housing Society in Gulbahar, Karachi, Pakistan
Sultanabad, Karachi, neighborhood in Karachi, Pakistan

Tajikistan
Sultonobod or Sultanabad, a village in Rudaki District, Tajikistan.

Uzbekistan
Sultonobod or Sultanabad, an urban-type settlement in Andijan Region, Uzbekistan.

See also
Soltanabad (disambiguation)